Lavrinhas is a municipality in the state of São Paulo in Brazil. It is formed by the seat and district of Pinheiros (which includes the hamlet of Capela do Jacu). The municipality is crossed by many rivers, creeks and so on; the main ones are: Jacu River, Braço River and Paraíba do Sul River, this one presenting rapids. It is a historical town, where many events of the 1932 Revolution took place in and which attracts, to this day, many tourists, who’re taken by guides to the trenches, vestiges of the conflict. As for its economy, most of it is based on agriculture, cattle raising and tourism.

Location
Lavrinhas is part of the Metropolitan Region of Vale do Paraíba e Litoral Norte. The state of Minas Gerais is bounded to the North.

The municipality contains part of the  Mananciais do Rio Paraíba do Sul Environmental Protection Area, created in 1982 to protect the sources of the Paraíba do Sul river.

Coat of arms

Its coat of arms has a red shield with the tag at the bottom reading Cave nam vigilio (Latin for "Watch yourself, for I'm watching") with two soldiers on each side and with three swords over three mountaintops coloured in orange.

Flag

Its flag colors are white on the left side and yellow on the right side with its coat of arms of the left. The line is not straight.

Population history

References

External links
  http://www.lavrinhas.sp.gov.br
  Lavrinha on citybrazil.com.br
Municipal anthem of Lavrinhas 

Municipalities in São Paulo (state)